António Wesllem Sousa Monteiro (born 21 April 1985), known as Wesllem, is a Portuguese footballer who plays for Cypriot club Anagennisi Deryneia FC as a forward.

Club career
Born in Marco de Canaveses, Porto District of Brazilian descent, Wesllem played youth football for four teams including FC Porto. He spent the vast majority of his senior career also in Portugal, but mostly in the lower leagues.

Wesllem's only season in the Primeira Liga was 2009–10, when he represented Rio Ave FC. He only totalled 71 minutes of action during the entire campaign, his debut coming on 16 August 2009 in a 1–1 away draw with U.D. Leiria.

In the summer of 2012, after a further two years in the second level, Wesllem moved to the Cypriot Second Division with Anagennisi Deryneia FC. On 12 August 2013 he signed with another side in the country, AEK Kouklia FC. He made his first appearance in the First Division – as the club – against AEK Larnaca FC on the 31st, playing the full 90 minutes in a 2–1 home win.

References

External links

1985 births
Living people
People from Marco de Canaveses
Brazilian people of Portuguese descent
Brazilian footballers
Portuguese footballers
Association football forwards
Primeira Liga players
Liga Portugal 2 players
Segunda Divisão players
Leixões S.C. players
Leça F.C. players
Rio Ave F.C. players
F.C. Penafiel players
Cypriot First Division players
Cypriot Second Division players
Anagennisi Deryneia FC players
AEK Kouklia F.C. players
Pafos FC players
I liga players
Olimpia Grudziądz players
Brazilian expatriate footballers
Portuguese expatriate footballers
Expatriate footballers in Cyprus
Expatriate footballers in Poland
Brazilian expatriate sportspeople in Cyprus
Portuguese expatriate sportspeople in Cyprus
Brazilian expatriate sportspeople in Poland
Portuguese expatriate sportspeople in Poland
Sportspeople from Porto District